Mumtaz Akhtar (born 8 December 1988) is an Indian professional footballer who plays as a central midfielder for Pune in the I-League.

Career statistics

References

External links 
 Pune Football Club profile.

1988 births
Living people
People from Punjab, India
Indian footballers
Mohammedan SC (Kolkata) players
United Sikkim F.C. players
Pune FC players
Association football midfielders
Footballers from Punjab, India
I-League players
I-League 2nd Division players
Punjabi people